The 1962 Pittsburgh Pirates season involved the team's 93–68 season, good for fourth place in the National League, eight games behind the NL Champion San Francisco Giants.

Offseason 
 October 10, 1961: 1961 Major League Baseball expansion draft
Joe Christopher was drafted from the Pirates by the New York Mets.
Al Jackson was drafted from the Pirates by the New York Mets.
 November 21, 1961: Coot Veal was purchased by the Pirates from the Washington Senators.
 December 4, 1961: Ramón Hernández was purchased from the Pirates by the Los Angeles Angels.

Regular season

Season standings

Record vs. opponents

Game log

|- bgcolor="ccffcc"
| 1 || April 10 || Phillies || 6–0 || Friend (1–0) || Owens || — || 28,813 || 1–0
|- bgcolor="ccffcc"
| 2 || April 13 || @ Mets || 4–3 || Sturdivant (1–0) || Jones || Face (1) || 12,447 || 2–0
|- bgcolor="ccffcc"
| 3 || April 14 || @ Mets || 6–2 || Mizell (1–0) || Jackson || Face (2) || 9,231 || 3–0
|- bgcolor="ccffcc"
| 4 || April 15 || @ Mets || 7–2 || Friend (2–0) || Craig || — || 11,278 || 4–0
|- bgcolor="ccffcc"
| 5 || April 16 || @ Cubs || 6–5 || Olivo (1–0) || Anderson || Face (3) || 1,642 || 5–0
|- bgcolor="ccffcc"
| 6 || April 17 || @ Cubs || 10–6 || Haddix (1–0) || Schultz || — || 1,937 || 6–0
|- bgcolor="ccffcc"
| 7 || April 18 || @ Phillies || 4–3 || Francis (1–0) || Hamilton || — || 7,284 || 7–0
|- bgcolor="ccffcc"
| 8 || April 19 || @ Phillies || 6–3 || McBean (1–0) || Mahaffey || Lamabe (1) || 8,427 || 8–0
|- bgcolor="ccffcc"
| 9 || April 21 || Mets || 8–4 || Friend (3–0) || Miller || Face (4) || 17,927 || 9–0
|- bgcolor="ccffcc"
| 10 || April 22 || Mets || 4–3 || Veale (1–0) || Jones || — || 13,780 || 10–0
|- bgcolor="ffbbbb"
| 11 || April 23 || Mets || 1–9 || Hook || Sturdivant (1–1) || — || 16,676 || 10–1
|- bgcolor="ccffcc"
| 12 || April 24 || Giants || 7–3 || McBean (2–0) || Marichal || Face (5) || 18,620 || 11–1
|- bgcolor="ffbbbb"
| 13 || April 25 || Giants || 3–8 || Perry || Friend (3–1) || Larsen || 21,652 || 11–2
|- bgcolor="ffbbbb"
| 14 || April 27 || @ Dodgers || 2–7 || Drysdale || Veale (1–1) || — || 40,509 || 11–3
|- bgcolor="ffbbbb"
| 15 || April 28 || @ Dodgers || 1–2 || Koufax || Francis (1–1) || — || 26,332 || 11–4
|- bgcolor="ccffcc"
| 16 || April 29 || @ Dodgers || 6–1 || Friend (4–1) || Podres || — ||  || 12–4
|- bgcolor="ccffcc"
| 17 || April 29 || @ Dodgers || 1–0 || McBean (3–0) || Moeller || — || 51,574 || 13–4
|- bgcolor="ffbbbb"
| 18 || April 30 || @ Giants || 1–4 || Perry || Mizell (1–1) || — || 9,543 || 13–5
|-

|- bgcolor="ffbbbb"
| 19 || May 1 || @ Giants || 2–4 || O'Dell || Veale (1–2) || — || 23,657 || 13–6
|- bgcolor="ffbbbb"
| 20 || May 2 || @ Giants || 2–3 || Marichal || Francis (1–2) || — || 9,926 || 13–7
|- bgcolor="ffbbbb"
| 21 || May 3 || @ Giants || 4–8 || Sanford || Haddix (1–1) || — || 10,723 || 13–8
|- bgcolor="ccffcc"
| 22 || May 4 || Dodgers || 5–4 || Face (1–0) || Moeller || — || 20,986 || 14–8
|- bgcolor="ffbbbb"
| 23 || May 5 || Dodgers || 1–10 || Drysdale || Sturdivant (1–2) || — || 13,366 || 14–9
|- bgcolor="ffbbbb"
| 24 || May 9 || @ Braves || 2–4 || Piche || Friend (4–2) || Fischer || 3,673 || 14–10
|- bgcolor="ffbbbb"
| 25 || May 10 || @ Braves || 3–4 || Fischer || Face (1–1) || — || 2,746 || 14–11
|- bgcolor="ffbbbb"
| 26 || May 11 || @ Reds || 2–3 (10) || Jay || McBean (3–1) || — || 10,448 || 14–12
|- bgcolor="ffbbbb"
| 27 || May 12 || @ Reds || 2–9 || O'Toole || Law (0–1) || — || 16,858 || 14–13
|- bgcolor="ffbbbb"
| 28 || May 13 || @ Reds || 4–6 || Purkey || Friend (4–3) || Brosnan || 12,004 || 14–14
|- bgcolor="ccffcc"
| 29 || May 15 || Braves || 5–4 (10) || Haddix (2–1) || Curtis || — || 9,641 || 15–14
|- bgcolor="ccffcc"
| 30 || May 16 || Braves || 6–0 || McBean (4–1) || Hendley || Olivo (1) || 11,168 || 16–14
|- bgcolor="ffbbbb"
| 31 || May 17 || Braves || 2–7 || Shaw || Friend (4–4) || — || 10,010 || 16–15
|- bgcolor="ffbbbb"
| 32 || May 18 || Reds || 1–4 || Purkey || Haddix (2–2) || — || 17,425 || 16–16
|- bgcolor="ccffcc"
| 33 || May 20 || Reds || 8–2 || Law (1–1) || Jay || — || 14,971 || 17–16
|- bgcolor="ccffcc"
| 34 || May 21 || Cubs || 8–4 || Sturdivant (2–2) || Ellsworth || — || 7,560 || 18–16
|- bgcolor="ffbbbb"
| 35 || May 22 || Cubs || 1–3 || Cardwell || Friend (4–5) || — || 9,584 || 18–17
|- bgcolor="ccffcc"
| 36 || May 23 || @ Cardinals || 6–3 || Haddix (3–2) || Jackson || Olivo (2) || 9,147 || 19–17
|- bgcolor="ccffcc"
| 37 || May 24 || @ Cardinals || 5–2 || McBean (5–1) || Sadecki || Face (6) || 8,536 || 20–17
|- bgcolor="ccffcc"
| 38 || May 25 || @ Colt .45s || 4–3 (13) || Face (2–1) || Tiefenauer || Sturdivant (1) || 11,350 || 21–17
|- bgcolor="ffbbbb"
| 39 || May 26 || @ Colt .45s || 0–2 || Golden || Friend (4–6) || — || 13,909 || 21–18
|- bgcolor="ccffcc"
| 40 || May 27 || @ Colt .45s || 7–2 || Law (2–1) || Johnson || — || 11,793 || 22–18
|- bgcolor="ccffcc"
| 41 || May 28 || Cardinals || 3–1 || Haddix (4–2) || Broglio || — || 8,051 || 23–18
|- bgcolor="ccffcc"
| 42 || May 29 || Cardinals || 7–6 || Sturdivant (3–2) || Shantz || — || 17,171 || 24–18
|- bgcolor="ccffcc"
| 43 || May 30 || Cardinals || 3–1 || Francis (2–2) || Washburn || Olivo (3) || 17,186 || 25–18
|- bgcolor="ccffcc"
| 44 || May 31 || Cardinals || 5–4 || Friend (5–6) || Simmons || Olivo (4) || 10,466 || 26–18
|-

|- bgcolor="ccffcc"
| 45 || June 1 || Colt .45s || 8–4 || Face (3–1) || Golden || — || 14,961 || 27–18
|- bgcolor="ccffcc"
| 46 || June 2 || Colt .45s || 9–2 || Law (3–1) || Farrell || — || 11,703 || 28–18
|- bgcolor="ffbbbb"
| 47 || June 3 || Colt .45s || 6–10 || Tiefenauer || Sturdivant (3–3) || McMahon ||  || 28–19
|- bgcolor="ffbbbb"
| 48 || June 3 || Colt .45s || 3–10 || Johnson || McBean (5–2) || — || 24,282 || 28–20
|- bgcolor="ffbbbb"
| 49 || June 5 || Dodgers || 2–3 || Williams || Francis (2–3) || Sherry ||  || 28–21
|- bgcolor="ffbbbb"
| 50 || June 5 || Dodgers || 3–8 || Drysdale || Friend (5–7) || Koufax || 18,579 || 28–22
|- bgcolor="ffbbbb"
| 51 || June 6 || Dodgers || 3–5 || Moeller || Gibbon (0–1) || Perranoski || 13,667 || 28–23
|- bgcolor="ccffcc"
| 52 || June 7 || Dodgers || 3–2 || Face (4–1) || Sherry || — || 12,177 || 29–23
|- bgcolor="ffbbbb"
| 53 || June 9 || @ Braves || 3–4 || Shaw || Law (3–2) || — ||  || 29–24
|- bgcolor="ffbbbb"
| 54 || June 9 || @ Braves || 3–5 || Cloninger || McBean (5–3) || Nottebart || 8,901 || 29–25
|- bgcolor="ccffcc"
| 55 || June 10 || @ Braves || 12–8 || Friend (6–7) || Piche || Sturdivant (2) ||  || 30–25
|- bgcolor="ccffcc"
| 56 || June 10 || @ Braves || 3–2 || Francis (3–3) || Hendley || Face (7) || 14,082 || 31–25
|- bgcolor="ccffcc"
| 57 || June 11 || @ Cubs || 6–1 || Gibbon (1–1) || Cardwell || Olivo (5) || 5,354 || 32–25
|- bgcolor="ccffcc"
| 58 || June 12 || @ Cubs || 4–3 || Haddix (5–2) || Hobbie || Face (8) || 3,200 || 33–25
|- bgcolor="ccffcc"
| 59 || June 13 || @ Cubs || 6–4 || McBean (6–3) || Koonce || Face (9) || 4,872 || 34–25
|- bgcolor="ccffcc"
| 60 || June 14 || @ Cubs || 6–3 || Friend (7–7) || Ellsworth || — || 5,005 || 35–25
|- bgcolor="ccffcc"
| 61 || June 15 || Braves || 9–8 || Lamabe (1–0) || Nottebart || Face (10) || 21,673 || 36–25
|- bgcolor="ffbbbb"
| 62 || June 16 || Braves || 1–2 || Burdette || Law (3–3) || — || 22,437 || 36–26
|- bgcolor="ccffcc"
| 63 || June 17 || Braves || 7–3 || Haddix (6–2) || Spahn || — || 15,448 || 37–26
|- bgcolor="ffbbbb"
| 64 || June 18 || Reds || 5–6 || Jay || Friend (7–8) || Klippstein ||  || 37–27
|- bgcolor="ffbbbb"
| 65 || June 18 || Reds || 2–4 || Purkey || McBean (6–4) || — || 21,884 || 37–28
|- bgcolor="ffbbbb"
| 66 || June 19 || Reds || 1–2 || Maloney || Francis (3–4) || Henry || 12,167 || 37–29
|- bgcolor="ccffcc"
| 67 || June 20 || Reds || 5–4 || Law (4–3) || O'Toole || Face (11) || 12,965 || 38–29
|- bgcolor="ccffcc"
| 68 || June 22 || Cubs || 7–5 || Gibbon (2–1) || Schultz || Face (12) || 13,710 || 39–29
|- bgcolor="ccffcc"
| 69 || June 23 || Cubs || 4–3 || Olivo (2–0) || Elston || — || 8,521 || 40–29
|- bgcolor="ffbbbb"
| 70 || June 24 || Cubs || 3–4 || Buhl || McBean (6–5) || Anderson ||  || 40–30
|- bgcolor="ffbbbb"
| 71 || June 24 || Cubs || 4–8 || Koonce || Francis (3–5) || Schultz || 15,676 || 40–31
|- bgcolor="ccffcc"
| 72 || June 25 || Mets || 13–3 || Law (5–3) || Anderson || — || 9,310 || 41–31
|- bgcolor="ccffcc"
| 73 || June 26 || Mets || 5–2 || Francis (4–5) || Hunter || Face (13) || 9,534 || 42–31
|- bgcolor="ccffcc"
| 74 || June 27 || Mets || 6–5 (10) || Olivo (3–0) || Craig || — || 12,468 || 43–31
|- bgcolor="ffbbbb"
| 75 || June 29 || @ Cardinals || 0–5 || Simmons || Haddix (6–3) || — || 18,531 || 43–32
|- bgcolor="ccffcc"
| 76 || June 30 || @ Cardinals || 17–7 || Law (6–3) || Washburn || Olivo (6) || 22,527 || 44–32
|-

|- bgcolor="ccffcc"
| 77 || July 1 || @ Cardinals || 7–2 || McBean (7–5) || Jackson || — || 25,977 || 45–32
|- bgcolor="ccffcc"
| 78 || July 2 || @ Colt .45s || 4–2 || Friend (8–8) || Woodeshick || Face (14) || 11,760 || 46–32
|- bgcolor="ccffcc"
| 79 || July 3 || @ Colt .45s || 5–2 || Haddix (7–3) || Johnson || Face (15) || 10,729 || 47–32
|- bgcolor="ccffcc"
| 80 || July 4 || @ Colt .45s || 7–0 || Law (7–3) || Bruce || — ||  || 48–32
|- bgcolor="ccffcc"
| 81 || July 4 || @ Colt .45s || 4–3 || Francis (5–5) || Golden || Face (16) || 20,005 || 49–32
|- bgcolor="ccffcc"
| 82 || July 5 || Phillies || 5–0 || McBean (8–5) || Owens || — || 13,623 || 50–32
|- bgcolor="ffbbbb"
| 83 || July 6 || Phillies || 2–6 || Mahaffey || Friend (8–9) || — || 15,836 || 50–33
|- bgcolor="ccffcc"
| 84 || July 7 || Phillies || 6–4 || Face (5–1) || Short || — || 8,781 || 51–33
|- bgcolor="ffbbbb"
| 85 || July 8 || Phillies || 4–8 || Baldschun || Law (7–4) || — ||  || 51–34
|- bgcolor="ccffcc"
| 86 || July 8 || Phillies || 6–5 || Sturdivant (4–3) || Smith || Face (17) || 16,147 || 52–34
|- bgcolor="ccffcc"
| 87 || July 12 || Colt .45s || 6–4 || McBean (9–5) || Golden || — || 14,784 || 53–34
|- bgcolor="ccffcc"
| 88 || July 13 || Colt .45s || 4–0 || Friend (9–9) || Farrell || — || 15,376 || 54–34
|- bgcolor="ccffcc"
| 89 || July 14 || Colt .45s || 4–2 || Law (8–4) || Bruce || — || 7,343 || 55–34
|- bgcolor="ffbbbb"
| 90 || July 15 || Cardinals || 2–3 (10) || Washburn || Face (5–2) || McDaniel ||  || 55–35
|- bgcolor="ccffcc"
| 91 || July 15 || Cardinals || 8–7 || Face (6–2) || Ferrarese || — || 26,905 || 56–35
|- bgcolor="ccffcc"
| 92 || July 16 || Cardinals || 5–2 || McBean (10–5) || Sadecki || — || 16,747 || 57–35
|- bgcolor="ccffcc"
| 93 || July 19 || @ Mets || 5–1 || Friend (10–9) || Jackson || — ||  || 58–35
|- bgcolor="ccffcc"
| 94 || July 19 || @ Mets || 7–6 (10) || Face (7–2) || Hook || — || 16,540 || 59–35
|- bgcolor="ffbbbb"
| 95 || July 20 || Giants || 3–6 || Sanford || Law (8–5) || Larsen || 37,705 || 59–36
|- bgcolor="ccffcc"
| 96 || July 21 || Giants || 7–6 (11) || Face (8–2) || Larsen || — || 23,917 || 60–36
|- bgcolor="ffbbbb"
| 97 || July 22 || Giants || 4–5 || Marichal || Haddix (7–4) || — || 27,973 || 60–37
|- bgcolor="ffbbbb"
| 98 || July 23 || @ Reds || 0–3 || O'Toole || Friend (10–10) || — || 11,168 || 60–38
|- bgcolor="ffbbbb"
| 99 || July 24 || @ Reds || 4–6 || Jay || Francis (5–6) || Henry || 11,521 || 60–39
|- bgcolor="ffbbbb"
| 100 || July 25 || @ Reds || 6–13 || Purkey || McBean (10–6) || — || 13,347 || 60–40
|- bgcolor="ffbbbb"
| 101 || July 26 || @ Reds || 3–5 || Klippstein || Law (8–6) || Henry || 8,349 || 60–41
|- bgcolor="ffbbbb"
| 102 || July 27 || @ Phillies || 3–5 || Green || Haddix (7–5) || Short ||  || 60–42
|- bgcolor="ccffcc"
| 103 || July 27 || @ Phillies || 4–1 || Friend (11–10) || Hamilton || Face (18) || 21,159 || 61–42
|- bgcolor="ffbbbb"
| 104 || July 28 || @ Phillies || 2–9 || Mahaffey || Francis (5–7) || — || 12,450 || 61–43
|- bgcolor="ffbbbb"
| 105 || July 29 || @ Phillies || 1–8 || McLish || McBean (10–7) || — || 8,502 || 61–44
|-

|- bgcolor="ccffcc"
| 106 || August 1 || @ Dodgers || 9–1 || Friend (12–10) || Williams || — || 42,068 || 62–44
|- bgcolor="ffbbbb"
| 107 || August 2 || @ Dodgers || 3–5 || Podres || Gibbon (2–2) || Sherry || 40,722 || 62–45
|- bgcolor="ccffcc"
| 108 || August 3 || @ Giants || 5–2 || McBean (11–7) || Marichal || Face (19) || 15,910 || 63–45
|- bgcolor="ffbbbb"
| 109 || August 4 || @ Giants || 5–6 || Sanford || Olivo (3–1) || Bolin || 29,370 || 63–46
|- bgcolor="ffbbbb"
| 110 || August 5 || @ Giants || 1–2 || O'Dell || Friend (12–11) || — || 25,532 || 63–47
|- bgcolor="ffbbbb"
| 111 || August 7 || Cardinals || 0–5 || Broglio || Gibbon (2–3) || — || 17,294 || 63–48
|- bgcolor="ffbbbb"
| 112 || August 8 || Cardinals || 0–2 || Gibson || McBean (11–8) || — || 11,267 || 63–49
|- bgcolor="ffbbbb"
| 113 || August 10 || @ Cubs || 6–7 || Schultz || Face (8–3) || — || 7,656 || 63–50
|- bgcolor="ccffcc"
| 114 || August 11 || @ Cubs || 10–6 || Law (9–6) || Ellsworth || Face (20) || 1,238 || 64–50
|- bgcolor="ccffcc"
| 115 || August 12 || @ Cubs || 5–4 || Lamabe (2–0) || Elston || Face (21) || 14,261 || 65–50
|- bgcolor="ccffcc"
| 116 || August 14 || Dodgers || 2–1 || McBean (12–8) || Podres || — || 2,121 || 66–50
|- bgcolor="ccffcc"
| 117 || August 15 || Dodgers || 6–3 || Friend (13–11) || Drysdale || Olivo (7) || 25,670 || 67–50
|- bgcolor="ffbbbb"
| 118 || August 16 || Dodgers || 3–7 || Williams || Gibbon (2–4) || Perranoski || 23,291 || 67–51
|- bgcolor="ccffcc"
| 119 || August 17 || Phillies || 9–1 || Haddix (8–5) || Hamilton || — || 13,713 || 68–51
|- bgcolor="ccffcc"
| 120 || August 18 || Phillies || 5–2 || Sturdivant (5–3) || McLish || Face (22) || 10,611 || 69–51
|- bgcolor="ffbbbb"
| 121 || August 19 || Phillies || 2–3 || Short || Face (8–4) || Baldschun || 15,680 || 69–52
|- bgcolor="ccffcc"
| 122 || August 20 || @ Mets || 2–0 || Friend (14–11) || Hook || — ||  || 70–52
|- bgcolor="ccffcc"
| 123 || August 20 || @ Mets || 6–3 || McBean (13–8) || Miller || Face (23) || 8,214 || 71–52
|- bgcolor="ccffcc"
| 124 || August 21 || @ Mets || 8–6 || Olivo (4–1) || Craig || Face (24) ||  || 72–52
|- bgcolor="ffbbbb"
| 125 || August 21 || @ Mets || 4–5 || Miller || Face (8–5) || — || 4,184 || 72–53
|- bgcolor="ccffcc"
| 126 || August 22 || Colt .45s || 3–0 || Sturdivant (6–3) || Brunet || — || 10,553 || 73–53
|- bgcolor="ccffcc"
| 127 || August 23 || Colt .45s || 4–0 || Law (10–6) || Johnson || — || 10,742 || 74–53
|- bgcolor="ffbbbb"
| 128 || August 25 || @ Cardinals || 2–3 || Jackson || Friend (14–12) || — ||  || 74–54
|- bgcolor="ccffcc"
| 129 || August 25 || @ Cardinals || 4–0 || Francis (6–7) || Simmons || — || 8,959 || 75–54
|- bgcolor="ffbbbb"
| 130 || August 26 || @ Cardinals || 5–6 || Shantz || Face (8–6) || — ||  || 75–55
|- bgcolor="ccffcc"
| 131 || August 26 || @ Cardinals || 7–6 || Sturdivant (7–3) || McDaniel || Lamabe (2) || 25,556 || 76–55
|- bgcolor="ccffcc"
| 132 || August 28 || Cubs || 7–6 || Olivo (5–1) || Elston || — || 10,175 || 77–55
|- bgcolor="ccffcc"
| 133 || August 29 || Cubs || 5–2 || Friend (15–12) || Koonce || Face (25) || 10,714 || 78–55
|- bgcolor="ccffcc"
| 134 || August 30 || Cubs || 5–3 || McBean (14–8) || Cardwell || Face (26) || 13,639 || 79–55
|- bgcolor="ffbbbb"
| 135 || August 31 || @ Phillies || 2–3 (11) || Baldschun || Francis (6–8) || — || 8,191 || 79–56
|-

|- bgcolor="ccffcc"
| 136 || September 1 || @ Phillies || 7–6 || Sturdivant (8–3) || Owens || Face (27) || 8,297 || 80–56
|- bgcolor="ccffcc"
| 137 || September 3 || Mets || 2–0 || Friend (16–12) || Hook || — ||  || 81–56
|- bgcolor="ccffcc"
| 138 || September 3 || Mets || 5–4 || McBean (15–8) || Craig || Face (28) || 14,289 || 82–56
|- bgcolor="ccffcc"
| 139 || September 4 || Mets || 5–1 || Haddix (9–5) || Anderson || — || 4,364 || 83–56
|- bgcolor="ffbbbb"
| 140 || September 5 || @ Colt .45s || 3–5 || Umbricht || Law (10–7) || McMahon || 4,593 || 83–57
|- bgcolor="ffbbbb"
| 141 || September 6 || @ Colt .45s || 3–4 || Kemmerer || Face (8–7) || — || 5,196 || 83–58
|- bgcolor="ccffcc"
| 142 || September 7 || @ Dodgers || 10–1 || Francis (7–8) || Williams || — || 36,368 || 84–58
|- bgcolor="ffbbbb"
| 143 || September 8 || @ Dodgers || 1–6 || Richert || McBean (15–9) || — || 43,887 || 84–59
|- bgcolor="ffbbbb"
| 144 || September 9 || @ Dodgers || 3–5 || Podres || Friend (16–13) || Perranoski || 37,594 || 84–60
|- bgcolor="ffbbbb"
| 145 || September 10 || @ Giants || 1–4 || O'Dell || Haddix (9–6) || — || 19,498 || 84–61
|- bgcolor="ffbbbb"
| 146 || September 11 || @ Giants || 0–2 || Sanford || Sturdivant (8–4) || — || 10,283 || 84–62
|- bgcolor="ccffcc"
| 147 || September 14 || Giants || 5–1 || Francis (8–8) || O'Dell || — || 14,354 || 85–62
|- bgcolor="ccffcc"
| 148 || September 15 || Giants || 5–1 || Friend (17–13) || Sanford || — || 10,340 || 86–62
|- bgcolor="ccffcc"
| 149 || September 16 || Giants || 6–4 (10) || Gibbon (3–4) || Miller || — || 14,216 || 87–62
|- bgcolor="ccffcc"
| 150 || September 17 || Giants || 5–2 || Sturdivant (9–4) || McCormick || — || 8,364 || 88–62
|- bgcolor="ffbbbb"
| 151 || September 18 || Reds || 4–7 (10) || Henry || Lamabe (2–1) || Klippstein || 5,656 || 88–63
|- bgcolor="ccffcc"
| 152 || September 19 || Reds || 1–0 || Friend (18–13) || Maloney || — || 3,437 || 89–63
|- bgcolor="ccffcc"
| 153 || September 20 || Reds || 4–3 || Priddy (1–0) || Henry || — || 3,957 || 90–63
|- bgcolor="ffbbbb"
| 154 || September 21 || Braves || 3–7 || Spahn || McBean (15–10) || — || 6,339 || 90–64
|- bgcolor="ffbbbb"
| 155 || September 22 || Braves || 0–2 || Constable || Sisk (0–1) || — || 5,153 || 90–65
|- bgcolor="ffbbbb"
| 156 || September 23 || Braves || 3–10 || Cloninger || Friend (18–14) || — || 24,323 || 90–66
|- bgcolor="ffbbbb"
| 157 || September 25 || @ Reds || 1–2 || Purkey || Sturdivant (9–5) || — || 4,500 || 90–67
|- bgcolor="ccffcc"
| 158 || September 26 || @ Reds || 1–0 (11) || Francis (9–8) || Klippstein || Friend (1) || 3,623 || 91–67
|- bgcolor="ccffcc"
| 159 || September 28 || @ Braves || 8–2 || Veale (2–2) || Constable || — || 4,274 || 92–67
|- bgcolor="ffbbbb"
| 160 || September 29 || @ Braves || 3–7 || Spahn || Sisk (0–2) || — || 11,339 || 92–68
|- bgcolor="ccffcc"
| 161 || September 30 || @ Braves || 4–3 || Lamabe (3–1) || Raymond || Veale (1) || 7,376 || 93–68
|-

|-
| Legend:       = Win       = LossBold = Pirates team member

Opening Day lineup

Notable transactions 
 May 7, 1962: Vinegar Bend Mizell was traded by the Pirates to the New York Mets for Jim Marshall.
 June 1962: Coot Veal was traded by the Pirates to the Detroit Tigers for Al Pehanick (minors).
 September 9, 1962: Byron Browne was signed as an amateur free agent by the Pirates.

Roster

Statistics
Batting
Note: G = Games played; AB = At bats; H = Hits; Avg. = Batting average; HR = Home runs; RBI = Runs batted in

Pitching
Note: G = Games pitched; IP = Innings pitched; W = Wins; L = Losses; ERA = Earned run average; SO = Strikeouts

Farm system

LEAGUE CHAMPIONS: Kinston

Notes

References 
 1962 Pittsburgh Pirates team page at Baseball Reference
 1962 Pittsburgh Pirates Page at Baseball Almanac

Pittsburgh Pirates seasons
Pittsburgh Pirates season
Pittsburg